Star Legend (formerly Royal Viking Queen, Queen Odyssey and Seabourn Legend) is a cruise ship constructed by Schichau-Seebeckwerft in Bremerhaven, Germany and operated by Windstar Cruises.

She is the identical sister ship of Star Pride and Star Breeze, all designed by Petter Yran and Bjørn Storbraaten.

History 

The construction of the ultra-luxury cruise yacht Royal Viking Queen began in 1990 by Schichau-Seebeckwerft in Bremerhaven, Germany. She was originally planned and ordered for Seabourn Cruise Line in 1990, but was delayed due to investors' financial constraints and was ultimately purchased by Royal Viking Line. She was the last ship to be built for Royal Viking Line and the smallest. She was launched in May 1991, and was completed in February 1992. She was put into service for Kloster Cruise. She operated her sea trials and her maiden voyage began on 11 February 1992 and was finished on 29 February 1992. The ship operated on various crossings for Royal Viking Line, a Kloster subsidiary.

In 1995, the vessel's name was changed to Queen Odyssey after she was assigned to Royal Cruise Line, another Kloster subsidiary. She remained in operation for Royal Cruise Line until January 1996, when she was sold to Seabourn and joined her sister ships.

Seabourn Legend was featured in the 1997 film Speed 2: Cruise Control.

She departed the Seabourn fleet in April 2015, and entered service for Windstar Cruises in May 2015.

References

External links 
 
 Results for Vessel:  Seabourn Legend, United States Coast Guard Maritime Information Exchange, including dimensions and tonnage.

Ships of Seabourn Cruise Line
Ships built in Bremen (state)
1991 ships